is a girls' school in Hakodate, Hokkaido, Japan. It consists of Iai Joshi Women's senior and junior high school.

History

Founded by Merriman Colbert Harris and wife Flora Harris in 1874, Iai Joshi Academy is the oldest girls' school in Japan's northernmost island of Hokkaido. In 1873, Harris, a missionary of the Methodist Episcopal Church, was sent to Japan and stationed in Hakodate, one of the first cities in Japan whose ports were opened as a result of the Ansei Treaties. The school started as a "day school" with an attendance of six in its first year.

References

External links 
 

High schools in Hokkaido